Zdzisław Stieber, (June 7, 1903 – October 12, 1980) was a Polish linguist and Slavist. He was born in Szczakowa, then part of the Austro-Hungarian province of Galicia (since 1918 Poland). His family was of assimilated German descent in Poland for generations. He died in Warsaw.

Initially a student of chemistry, Stieber turned his attention to comparative Slavic linguistics at the University of Kraków in 1926. His interest in the dialects of border areas led him to the study of East Slovak and Ukrainian dialects, where his work focused on toponyms, their etymology, and the history and settlement of the places where they are attested. He also carried out research on Sorbian and Belarusian, and was involved in producing linguistic atlases of Kashubian (1964–78), Polish (Nitsch 1957–70), and Lemkian (1956–64). Particularly valuable was his introduction of colors and symbols to dialect maps. Stieber's work in the 1930s represented some of the first studies of the dialect of the Lemko Rusyns. The deportation of this ethnic group in Operation Vistula after World War II underlines the importance of Stieber's work carried out while the community was still intact.

Stieber also produced works on the history and development of Polish (1934), Czech (1957), and Slavic in general (1969). Stieber held teaching appointments in Kraków, Lviv, Łódź, and Warsaw. His work in Polish and Slavic philology had a particularly strong influence on the introduction of the structural method in the teaching of phonology at the University of Łódź.

The Nitsch-Trnka-Stieber Law (stating that phonemic contrasts in a language can only be produced by regular sound laws or borrowing, but not as a result of analogical changes in morphophonemic rules) remains a matter of debate today (cf. Manaster-Ramer 1994).

In 1982 the Ukrainian Slavist George Y. Shevelov published an extensive reminiscence of Stieber in the journal Harvard Ukrainian Studies.

References

Further reading
 Manaster-Ramer, Alexis. 1994. On Three East Slavic Non-Counterexamples to Stieber's Law. JSL 2(1): 164–70.
 Nitsch, Kazimierz et al. (eds.). 1957–1970. Maly atlas gwar polskich. Wrocław.
 Shevelov, George Y. 1982. Zdzisław Stieber, In memoriam (7 June 1903 – 12 October 1980). Harvard Ukrainian Studies 6(1):79–92
 Stieber, Zdzisław. 1934. Geneza gwar laskich. Kraków.
 Stieber, Zdzisław. 1938. Sposoby powstawania słowiańskich gwar przejściowych. Kraków.
 Stieber, Zdzisław. 1956–64. Atlas językowy dawnej Łemkowszczyzny, 8 vols. Łódź.
 Stieber, Zdzisław 1969. Zarys gramatyki porównawczej języków słowiańskich. Warsaw.
 Stieber, Zdzisław et al. (eds.). 1964–1978. Atlas jezykowy Kaszubszczyzny i dialektów sąsiednich. Wrocław.
 Stieber, Zdzisław & Tadeusz Lehr-Splawiński 1957. Gramatyka historyczna języka czeskiego. Warsaw.

1903 births
1980 deaths
Polish people of German descent
Linguists from Poland
Jagiellonian University alumni
20th-century linguists